Eugene Joseph Dionne Jr. (born April 23, 1952) is an American journalist, political commentator, and long-time op-ed columnist for The Washington Post. He is also a senior fellow in governance studies at the Brookings Institution, a professor in the Foundations of Democracy and Culture at the McCourt School of Public Policy of Georgetown University, and an NPR, MSNBC, and PBS commentator.

Early life and education
Dionne was born in Boston, Massachusetts, on April 23, 1952, and raised in Fall River, Massachusetts. He is the son of the late Lucienne (née Galipeau), a librarian and teacher, and Eugène J. Dionne, a dentist. He is of French-Canadian descent. He attended Portsmouth Abbey School (then known as Portsmouth Priory), a Benedictine college preparatory school in Portsmouth, Rhode Island. Dionne holds an A.B. summa cum laude in Social Studies from Harvard University (1973), where he was elected to Phi Beta Kappa and was affiliated with Adams House. He also earned a DPhil in Sociology from Balliol College, Oxford (1982), where he was a Rhodes Scholar.

Career

Dionne's published works include the influential 1991 bestseller Why Americans Hate Politics, which argued that several decades of political polarization was alienating a silent centrist majority. It was characterized as radical centrist by Time. Later books include They Only Look Dead: Why Progressives Will Dominate the Next Political Era (1996), Stand up Fight Back: Republican Toughs, Democratic Wimps, and Politics of Revenge (2004), Souled Out: Reclaiming Faith and Politics After the Religious Right (2008), and Our Divided Political Heart: The Battle for the American Idea in an Age of Discontent (2012). His most recent book is One Nation After Trump: A Guide for the Perplexed, the Disillusioned, the Desperate and the Not-Yet Deported (2017), coauthored with Norman J. Ornstein and Thomas E. Mann.

Dionne is a columnist for Commonweal, a liberal Catholic publication. Before becoming a columnist for the Post in 1993, he worked as a reporter for that paper as well as The New York Times. He has joined the left-liberal The National Memo news-politics website.

Personal life
Dionne lives in Bethesda, Maryland, with his wife, Mary Boyle, and three children, James, Julia, and Margot.

Writings
 Why Americans Hate Politics. New York: Simon & Schuster, 1991. 
 They Only Look Dead: Why Progressives Will Dominate the Next Political Era. New York: Simon & Schuster, 1996.  
 Community Works: The Revival of Civil Society in America (editor). Washington, D.C.: Brookings Institution, 1998 
 Stand Up, Fight Back: Republican Toughs, Democratic Wimps, and the Politics of Revenge. New York: Simon & Schuster, 2004.  
 Souled Out: Reclaiming Faith and Politics After the Religious Right. Princeton: Princeton University Press, 2008. 
 Our Divided Political Heart: The Battle for the American Idea in an Age of Discontent. New York: Bloomsbury, 2012. 
 Why the Right Went Wrong: Conservatism From Goldwater to the Tea Party and Beyond. New York: Simon & Schuster, 2016.  
 One Nation After Trump: A Guide for the Perplexed, the Disillusioned, the Desperate, and the Not-Yet Deported. With Norman J. Ornstein and Thomas E. Mann. New York: St. Martin's Press, 2017. 
 Code Red: How Progressives and Moderates Can Unite to Save Our Country. New York: St. Martin's Press, 2020.

References

External links

 https://www.washingtonpost.com/people/ej-dionne-jr/
 Brookings Institution page
 Georgetown Faculty web page
 Interviewed by David Axelrod, "The Axe Files"
 NPR page
 Truthdig page
 Biography from the Washington Post Writers Group
 "Conversation with History" interview
 

1952 births
Living people
Alumni of Balliol College, Oxford
American newspaper journalists
American political writers
American male non-fiction writers
American Rhodes Scholars
McCourt School of Public Policy faculty
Harvard College alumni
People from Fall River, Massachusetts
Radical centrist writers
The New York Times writers
The Washington Post people
American people of French-Canadian descent
MSNBC people
Writers from Boston
PBS people
NPR personalities
Portsmouth Abbey School alumni
Brookings Institution people